Alkis Raftis is a dance historian, engineer, sociologist and manager.

Prof. Raftis is president of International Dance Council at UNESCO, Paris.[1] Since 1987 he is president of the national Dora Stratou Dance Theatre and Company in Athens.[2]

References

External links 
 International Dance Council (CID at UNESCO)
 Dora Stratou Dance Theatre and Company
 The Orchesis Portal

1942 births
Living people
Writers from Athens
Dance historians